JDS Chikugo (DE-215) was the lead ship of  of the Japan Maritime Self-Defense Force.

Development and design 
The main anti-submarine weapon was changed from the M/50  ASW rocket launcher to the ASROC Anti-submarine missile. The octuple launcher for ASROC was stationed at the mid-deck, and the entire ship design was prescribed by this stationing.

Construction and career
Chikugo was laid down on 9 December 1968 at Mitsui Engineering and Shipbuilding, Tamano, and launched on 13 January 1970. She commissioned on 31 July 1971.

On 26 August 1971, the 34th Escort Corps was newly commissioned under the Sasebo District Force, and was incorporated with  commissioned on the same day.

Removed from the register on 15 April 1995. Since commissioning, she consistently belonged to the Sasebo District Force for about 26 years, and had a total range of 503,405 nautical miles.

References

External links

1970 ships
Ships built by Mitsui Engineering and Shipbuilding
Chikugo-class destroyer escorts